Bill Stevenson (June 4, 1951 – March 19, 2007) was a Canadian Football League player with the Edmonton Eskimos.  After playing college football at Drake University, he was drafted by the NFL's Miami Dolphins and played in the World Football League with the Memphis Southmen for two seasons.  Then Stevenson spent his entire 14 year CFL career with the Eskimos, the first three as a defensive lineman and the remainder as an offensive lineman. He was named CFL All-Star 2 times and was a part of a CFL record seven Grey Cup championship teams with the Eskimos.

After his playing career ended, Stevenson struggled in his business and personal life, suffered through bankruptcy and divorce, and was forced to take refuge in shelters for the homeless. He died in 2007 in an accident when he slipped and fell backwards down the stairs in his mother's home in Edmonton.

On November 19, 2008, the CBC Television show The Fifth Estate suggested that Stevenson, who went through years of alcohol abuse and destitution, enduring the effects of years of unreported head injuries from playing professional football. Teammates York Hentschel and David Boone are believed to have had the same injuries.

References

External links
Just Sports Stats

1951 births
2007 deaths
Accidental deaths from falls
Accidental deaths in Alberta
American football offensive linemen
Canadian football offensive linemen
Canadian players of American football
Canadian people of British descent
Drake Bulldogs football players
Edmonton Elks players
Memphis Southmen players
People from Big Lakes County
Players of Canadian football from Alberta
Sportspeople with chronic traumatic encephalopathy